Utukuru is a village in Palnadu district of the Indian state of Andhra Pradesh. It is located in Krosuru mandal of Guntur revenue division.

Geography 

Governance 

Utukuru gram panchayat is the local self-government of the village. It is divided into wards and each ward is represented by a ward member. It forms a part of Andhra Pradesh Capital Region. The village forms a part of Andhra Pradesh Capital Region and is under the jurisdiction of APCRDA.

Education 

As per the school information report for the academic year 2018–19, the village has a total of 5 schools. These include one private and 4 Zilla Parishad/MPP schools.

References 

Villages in Palnadu district